The Battle of Duns or Battle of Duns Park was an engagement fought in 1372 near the site of the present day town of Duns, Berwickshire.

Background and battle
In retaliation for previous Scottish raids, Henry, Lord Percy, the English March Warden had invaded Scotland with 7,000 troops, and met little resistance. Having crossed the Merse, the English army camped at Duns awaiting reinforcements. The shepherds and farmers of Duns used a type of rattle out of dried skins with pebbles inside, which they used to scare wild animals away from their crops and beasts. These rattles were put to effect on the English encampment. By frightening the English horses, the English camp awoke in turmoil, in disarray and being harassed by the local peasantry, the English retired over the Border leaving their baggage behind.

The motto of the town of Duns: 'Duns dings a'!', is supposed to have come from this battle.

References

Notes

Sources
The Buik of the Croniclis of Scotland : or, A metrical version of the History of Hector Boece ed. Turnbull, W.B., London 1858 
Brenan, G., History of the House of Percy. London 1902 
Ridpath, G., The Border History of England and Scotland. London 1776

External links

Dunse History Society

Battle of Duns
Battle of Duns
Battles between England and Scotland
Berwickshire
History of the Scottish Borders
1372 in England
Duns
Duns